The Paphos Forest is a state forest located in the Troodos Mountains of Cyprus with an area of 70,000 hectares. It has been a Permanent Game Preserve since 1938 .

Paphos forest is a mediterranean type forest with both coniferous trees like Brutia pine (Pinus brutia) and Cyprus cedar (Cedrus brevifolia) and broadleaf trees like Golden oak (Quercus alnifolia) and Platanus orientalis. 

Paphos forest is home to the Cyprus mouflon, Red fox and Cyprus mouse. Also present in the forest are eight species of snakes and a large variety of lizard and frog species.

References

External links 

Forests of Cyprus